Lieutenant General  Werndly Renaut  Booysie van der Riet  (27 April 1914 - 28 February 1987) was a South African Army officer who served as Chief of the Defence Staff.

Military career 
He was awarded the Military Cross during World War II.

He commanded Witwatersrand Rifles Regiment from 1945 to 1946 and 1 Special Service Battalion from Oct 1953 to Dec 1960.

Awards and decorations 
General van der Riet was awarded the following:

References

|-

1914 births
1987 deaths
Recipients of the Military Cross
South African Army generals
South African military personnel of World War II
Graduates of the Staff College, Camberley